Phylactocephalus (meaning "bringing forth rays from the head") is a genus of prehistoric fish.

References

Prehistoric aulopiformes